Kakareza may refer to:

Kakareza-ye Amid Ali
Kakareza-ye Olya
Kakareza-ye Sofla
Kakareza-ye Vosta